Lieutenant-General Thomas Wentworth (c. 1693–1747), of Sunninghill, Berkshire, was a British Army officer and politician who sat in the House of Commons from 1743 to 1747. He served in the War of Jenkins' Ear and the Jacobite rising of 1745.

Early life
Wentworth was the third, but second surviving son of Sir Mathew Wentworth, 3rd Baronet, of Bretton, Yorkshire and his wife Elizabeth Osbaldeston, daughter of William Osbaldeston of Hunmanby, Yorkshire. He was the younger brother of Sir William Wentworth, 4th Baronet. He matriculated at University College, Oxford on 28 January 1710, aged 16. He married Elizabeth Lord, daughter of Robert Lord of London on 3 July 1720.

Career
From 1737 to 1745 Wentworth was Colonel of what would soon become the 24th Regiment of Foot. He became commander of the land troops in the amphibious expedition against Cartagena de Indias following the deaths of the original commander, Lord Cathcart, and his second-in-command, General Spotswood, during the War of Jenkins' Ear. He and his troops arrived there in 1741 in a fleet led by Rear-Admiral Sir Chaloner Ogle to reinforce Vice-admiral Edward Vernon, but the British forces still failed to take the town and the land forces suffered catastrophic losses of nearly ninety percent over the course of two years campaigning, mostly from disease.

Wentworth was returned as Member of Parliament for Whitchurch at a by-election in 1743. He voted with the Administration in 1744, and then served in Flanders. In 1745, he was with George Wade, during the Jacobite rising of 1745. He did not vote on the Hanoverians in 1746.

Death
Wentworth died without issue in November 1747.

References

External links
Jeremy Black, Britain as a Military Power, 1688-1815
Ogle data

1747 deaths
39th Regiment of Foot officers
5th Dragoon Guards officers
British Army generals
South Wales Borderers officers
British MPs 1741–1747
Members of the Parliament of Great Britain for English constituencies
Year of birth unknown
Year of birth uncertain
British Army personnel of the War of Jenkins' Ear
British Army personnel of the Jacobite rising of 1745